La Virginia (elevation 920 m) is a town and municipality in the Department of Risaralda, Colombia.

References

External links

 Official website. 

Municipalities of Risaralda Department